Arnold Joost van Keppel, 1st Earl of Albemarle, and lord of De Voorst in Guelders (Gelderland) (baptised 30 January 167030 May 1718), was a Dutch military leader who fought for King William III of England and became the first Earl of Albemarle. He was the son of Oswald van Keppel and his wife Anna Geertruid van Lintelo. De Voorst is a large country house near Zutphen, financed by William III, and not unlike the royal palace Het Loo in Apeldoorn.

Life
Arnold Joost van Keppel was born in Zutphen in the Dutch Republic about 1670 and was the heir of a junior branch of an ancient and noble family in Gelderland. He achieved fame and wealth as the right-hand man of William III of Orange. He became the page of honour to William III in his mid-teens, possibly as early as 1685. It has been claimed that he was William's lover, but no conclusive evidence has been discovered. Keppel accompanied William to England in the Glorious Revolution of 1688.

While some have suggested their association began when Keppel was only 16, others argue a later date, possibly at the time of a hunting accident when he is said to have attracted the king's attention by his uncomplaining demeanour upon breaking a leg. Public commentary on the relationship intensified in 1692 when Keppel began to receive grants of land from the king. He became Groom of the Bedchamber and Master of the Robes in 1695. In 1696, he was created the Viscount Bury in Lancashire, and the Baron Ashford of Ashford, Kent. On 10 February 1697, William made Van Keppel the Earl of Albemarle. In 1699, he was awarded the command of the First Life Guards.

In 1700, William gave Albemarle extensive lands in Ireland, but Parliament obliged the king to cancel this grant. William instead granted him £50,000. The same year he was created a Knight of the Garter. He served both with the English and Dutch troops, was a major-general in 1697, colonel of several regiments and governor of 's-Hertogenbosch.

Handsome and engaging, he rivalled Portland (whose jealousy he aroused in the royal favour), possessed William's full confidence, and accompanied him everywhere. In February 1702 William, then prostrated with his last illness, sent Albemarle to the Netherlands to arrange the coming campaign, and he only returned in time to receive William's last commissions on his deathbed, including being entrusted with the king's private papers.

After the death of William III, who bequeathed to him ƒ200,000 and the lordship of Bredevoort, Albemarle returned to the Netherlands, took his seat as a noble in the States-General, and became a general of cavalry in the Dutch army. He joined the forces of the allies in 1703 in the War of Spanish Succession, was present at the Battle of Ramillies in 1706, and at Oudenaarde in 1708, and distinguished himself at the siege of Lille. He commanded at the siege of Aire in 1710, led Marlborough's second line in 1711, and was general of the Dutch forces in 1712. As commander of the Dutch forces he successfully bombarded Arras and destroyed much of the French supplies there, but he was defeated at Denain after the withdrawal of Ormonde and the English forces and taken prisoner. He died on 30 May 1718, at the age of forty-eight.

Family

Albemarle married Geertruid Johanna Quirina van der Duyn, daughter of Adam van der Duyn, which today, the surname is known as Van Duyn in modern times after it was shortened in the mid-18th century. Their children were:
 William Anne, who succeeded him as 2nd Earl of Albemarle. He married the granddaughter of Charles II of England.
 Sophia (1716–1773), who married General John Thomas (son of Sir Edmond Thomas, 2nd Bt.). They had at least two sons. The younger son, Colonel Charles Nassau Thomas, became Vice-Chamberlain to George IV, when he was Prince of Wales and Prince Regent.

References

Attribution:
 
 Edmund Lodge The Genealogy of the Existing British Peerage, 1859. at Google Books

1670 births
1718 deaths
British and English royal favourites
British Life Guards officers
Arnold 1
Garter Knights appointed by William III
Pages of Honour
Arnold Keppel, 1st Earl of Albemarle
Keppel, Arnold van
Dutch emigrants to the Kingdom of England
Dutch army commanders in the War of the Spanish Succession
Dutch generals
18th-century Dutch military personnel